Shah Ismail Khatai is a Baku Metro station. It was opened on 22 February 1968. It was formerly called Shaumyan and is named after the Shah Ismail I Khatai.

See also
List of Baku metro stations

References

Baku Metro stations
Railway stations opened in 1968
1968 establishments in Azerbaijan